Wendy Rogers may refer to:

Wendy Rogers (politician) (born 1954), American member of the Arizona State Senate
Wendy Rogers (academic) (born 1957), Australian clinical ethicist and philosopher